Bernadeta Gaspà Bringueret  (born July 23, 1965) is an Andorran politician. She is a member of the Liberal Party of Andorra.

External links
Page at the General Council of the Principality of Andorra

Members of the General Council (Andorra)
1965 births
Living people
Andorran women in politics
Liberal Party of Andorra politicians
21st-century women politicians
21st-century Andorran politicians